The Aboakyer festival is a bushbuck hunting festival celebrated by the people of Winneba in the Central Region of Ghana.

Overview

The name Aboakyer translates as "hunting for game or animal" in the Fante dialect as spoken by the people of the Central Region. The institution of the festival was to commemorate the migration of Simpafo (traditional name given to the people of Winneba). The people migrated from the north-eastern African town of  Timbuktu in the ancient Western Sudan Empire to their present land in the central coast of Ghana. 
The journey from the north-east to the western part of Africa was led by two brothers. The people believed that a god, whom they called Otu, had protected them from all dangers during their migration and to show their appreciation, the people consulted the custodian of the god, a traditional priest who acted as an intermediary between the people and the god, to ask the god for its preferred sacrifice. To their astonishment, the god asked for a human sacrifice, someone from the royal family. This sacrifice went on for some years but was later stopped as the people were no longer interested in human sacrifices.

A request was made to the god to change the sacrifice type, as they believed that sacrificing royalty could eventually wipe out the royal family. The god in return asked for type of wild cat to be caught alive and presented to it at its shrine. After the presentation, it was to be beheaded as a sacrifice. This was to be done annually in a festival.

Before the festival began the people settled the god at a town called Penkye. After the resettlement, the god became known as Penkyi Otu, to signify the final home for the god. To mark the festival, the people sought out the wild cat, as had been prescribed. Many people died in the process as the animal was to be captured live and transported to Penkye. The people made a second appeal to Penkyi Otu to provide an alternative to the wild cat. That appeal resulted in the decision to accept a mature bushbuck. Two hunting groups, the Tuafo (Number one) and Dentsifo (Number two), have since bore the task of capturing the live bushbuck and presenting it to the people at the durbar. This festival is celebrated in May and it is a major event in Ghana. The warriors catch a bushbuck or deer with a weapon but with bare hands

Oral tradition
The people of Simpa passed on this tradition to their descendants in the form of songs, and sang it in their war chants and also told it during moonlit nights in story form. This oral tradition went on until the colonial Europeans arrived on the coast of the Gold Coast and with them the English language. Scholars then translated the oral story from the language 'Fante' to English.

The festival

The festival is celebrated on the first Saturday in May. On the first day of the festival, the two Asafo companies (warrior groups) in Winneba take part in a hunting expedition. The first troop to catch a live bushbuck from a game reserve used for this purpose and present it to the chiefs and people at a colorful durbar is declared winner and is highly regarded for bravery. The bushbuck is sacrificed and this signifies the start of the Aboakyer festival. The festival is used also to receive a productive harvest and spiritual guidance from their gods for the coming year.

Gallery

References

Central Region (Ghana)
Folk festivals in Ghana
Religious festivals in Ghana